Nuosu may refer to:
 Yi people
 Nuosu language, also known as Yi

Language and nationality disambiguation pages